Dzwonowo Leśne  is a settlement in the administrative district of Gmina Skoki, within Wągrowiec County, Greater Poland Voivodeship, in west-central Poland. It is in the Puszcza Zielonka forest, to the east of Dzwonowo. (The suffix Leśne in the name means "(of the) forest".)

References

Villages in Wągrowiec County